Ruth Mae Terry (born Ruth Mae McMahon, October 21, 1920 – March 11, 2016) was an American singer and actress in film and television from the 1930s to the 1960s. She claimed her stage name came from Walter Winchell, who combined the names of two then-famous baseball players, Babe Ruth and Bill Terry.

Early years
Terry was born in Benton Harbor, Michigan, the daughter of Irish-American parents, Mr. and Mrs. M. E. McMahon. She attended St John's Catholic School in Benton Harbor.

Terry won a number of prizes for singing before singing with the Paul Ash Theater Orchestra at the age of twelve. At that same age, she left her hometown to sing with Clyde McCoy's orchestra.

Career
Terry's first movie was Love and Hisses in 1937 with Walter Winchell, at which time she was earning $400 per week. Her first western was Call of the Canyon with Gene Autry. She appeared in several Roy Rogers movies. Her best-known movie was Pistol Packin' Mama, based on the song of the same name with Robert Livingston. She retired when she married her second husband in 1947.

While making films, Terry continued her singing career in a limited way. On August 15, 1943, she appeared as guest female singer on The Bob Crosby Show on NBC radio.

Personal life
On June 20, 1942, Terry and test pilot John Martin eloped and were married in Las Vegas, Nevada. On October 25, 1947, she married John P. Gilmour, a Canadian. A November 8, 1947, article in her hometown newspaper, The News-Palladium, reported, "She has given up her career as an actress and she and her husband and her four-year-old son by a previous marriage will make their home at St. Genevieve de Pierre Fonds, Quebec."

Terry was a Republican who supported Dwight Eisenhower in the 1952 presidential election.

Death
Terry died on March 11, 2016, at the age of 95. She was buried in Forest Lawn Cemetery (Cathedral City).

Filmography

References

External links

 
 
 Ruth Terry at the American Film Institute

1920 births
2016 deaths
Actresses from Michigan
American film actresses
American women singers
20th-century American actresses
Michigan Republicans
California Republicans
21st-century American women
Burials at Forest Lawn Cemetery (Cathedral City)